Publishing House ERSEN is one of the largest book publishers in Estonia.

The company cooperates with major English-language publishers and literary agencies to publish English and other titles in Estonia and the European Union.

References

External links
 

Book publishing companies of Estonia
Mass media in Tallinn